Cicindela repanda, commonly known as the bronzed tiger beetle or common shore tiger beetle, is a species of tiger beetle that measures  long, lives in most of North America. Its labrum is small with one tooth and the pronotum is coppery and hairy. The shoulder marking touches or nearly touches the middle band. It is usually seen in spring and summer and it lives in sand, gravel, or clay soil. Its food is many insects and some fruit. The species have a two-year life cycle. It can be found all across sand dunes around the Great Lakes. The species comprises three subspecies: C. repanda repanda, C. repanda novascotiae, and C. repanda tanneri.

References

External links
Bug Guide

repanda
Beetles described in 1825
Beetles of North America